Exchanger may refer to:

 Exchanger (protein), an integral membrane protein involved in active transport
 Digital currency exchanger, a market maker which exchanges fiat currency for electronic money
 Heat exchanger, a device built for efficient heat transfer from one medium to another
 Pressure exchanger, a device that transfers pressure energy from a high pressure fluid stream to a low pressure fluid stream

See also
 Exchange (disambiguation)